Sloppy Joe's Bar is a historic American bar in Key West, Florida  located at the corner of Duval and Greene street since 1937.

Description

Sloppy Joe's was purchased September 8, 1978 by Sid Snelgrove and Jim Mayer and has been owned by the two families since that time.

Open 365 days a year, each day begins at 9:00 am (noon on Sundays).  Sloppy Joe's has four complimentary divisions: bar, food, entertainment, and the Retail Store. The bar offers live music on stage every day Noon to 2:00am and dancing.  The performers offer a wide range of music styles and comical entertainment.

Just as in Joe Russell's day, hospitable Bartenders welcome patrons at virtually all hours of the day and night.
 	
The main Bar structure was built in 1917; and the second building, which houses the Kitchen and Joe's Tap Room, was built in 1892.

Joe's Tap Room is attached to Sloppy Joe's. Open daily at Noon, Joe's Tap Room has the same food menu as Sloppy Joe's and offers variety of crafted beers on tap.

The bar is the site of the annual Ernest Hemingway Look-Alike contest, started in 1981.

On November 1, 2006, it was added to the National Register of Historic Places.

Owners

Joe “Sloppy Joe” Russell (1889–1941), original owner, nickname Josie Grunts
Joe Russell Jr.
Lillian Spencer
Mama Joe and Papa Joe “Slim” Galaski (leased)
Stan and Marcy Smith (1960–78)
Snelgrove and Mayer families (1978 to present)

Other locations

Sloppy Joe's also has a location in Treasure Island, Florida and a third location in Daytona Beach, Florida opened in February 2010.

Popular culture
The bar is also referenced to in the famous film Citizen Kane, as the reporter Thompson interviews Kane's old friend and dramatic critic:

Gallery

References

External links

 Official website

Buildings and structures in Key West, Florida
Landmarks in Key West, Florida
History of Key West, Florida
Tourist attractions in Key West, Florida
National Register of Historic Places in Key West, Florida
Drinking establishments in Florida
1933 establishments in Florida
Drinking establishments on the National Register of Historic Places
Commercial buildings on the National Register of Historic Places in Florida
Restaurants in Florida